Dobczyce  is a town in southern Poland, situated since 1999 in the Lesser Poland Voivodeship (previously in Kraków Voivodeship from 1975 to 1998). As of December 2021, the town has a population of 6,388. 

There is a large dam with Lake Dobczyce on the Raba river, and a partially rebuilt 14th-century Dobczyce Castle, with ruins of a 14th-century defensive wall -  which is open for tourists. Dobczyce is also the name of a small part of Bobrowniki Małe, a village in Lesser Poland.

Dobczyce received its Magdeburg rights town charter probably in 1310, during the reign of Władysław Łokietek. The town was famous for its castle, where Jan Długosz liked to stay and work on his chronicles. Here, in 1450, Polish astronomer and dean of Kraków Academy Leonard Vitreatoris (Leonhard von Dobschütz) was born. Dobczyce enjoyed several royal privileges, allowing its residents to buy salt from nearby Wieliczka. The town was a local center of cloth and wool making, but the period of prosperity ended during the Swedish invasion of Poland (1655–1660). After the Partitions of Poland, Dobczyce was annexed by the Habsburg Empire, and from 1772 to 1918 belonged to Galicia. On the main square there is a 19th-century parish church.

Gallery

References

External links
 Jewish Community in Dobczyce on Virtual Shtetl

Cities and towns in Lesser Poland Voivodeship
Myślenice County
Kraków Voivodeship (14th century – 1795)
Kingdom of Galicia and Lodomeria
Kraków Voivodeship (1919–1939)